"Traveller" was recorded for Linde Nijland's album, A Musical Journey, in 2010. The story of the video is based on her lyrics, which portrait a traveller who asks herself questions along the road. Symbolically, the questions are about the meaning of life. The video is intended to convey the astral sense of the song. A 2D computer animation with watercolour paintings were designated for the background, to carry over the softness and pureness of Nijland's voice and music into the video.

No. 1 Frisian Charts 
On March 16, 2013, Traveller was voted No.1 by the viewers in the Klipkar+ TV Programme, Frisland, the Netherlands.

PBS 
On May 22, 2014, Traveller was voted the best short of the week on REEL13 programme, WNET, PBS.

Screening
International Noordfolk Festival – August 25, 2012 – Veenhuizen, Netherlands
Aria Gallery – September 9, 2012 – Tehran, Iran
Kinofest Digital Films Festival – October 26, 2012 – Bucharest, Romania
Mowlana theatre, November 14, 2012 – Qazvin, Iran
 Libélula International Animation Festival, Lloret de Mar, Spain, November 22, 2012
Dishman Art Museum, Texas, February 22, 2013
 Los Angeles – CinemaRtini – March 21, 2013
 Toronto Music Video Festival, March 22, 2013 – Toronto, Canada
 Roxy bar and Screen, April 7, 2013 – London, UK
 Lethbridge Alberta Motion Picture Showcase (LAMPS), April 11, 2013 – Alberta, Canada
 2nd Free State Film Festival, April 26–28, 2013 – Lawrence, Kansas, United States
 Norman Music Festival Music Video Picks, April 27, 2013 – Norman, Oklahoma, United States
 cIneMAGINE 2013 – May 24, 2013 – Lethbridge, Alberta 
 BAYMN FEST 2013 – June 1, 2013 – San Francisco, California, USA 
 Sprockets Music Video Festival 2013 – June 15, 2013 – Athens, Georgia, USA 
 The Co-operative International Film Festival – July 2013 – Bradford, UK 
 Walthamstow International Film Festival – July 14, 2013 – London, UK
 Portobello International Film Festival – August 30, 2013 – London, UK 
 Auburn International Film Festival for Children and Young Adults – September 19, 2013 – Sydney, Australia 
 Iranian Film Festival San Francisco – September 29, 2013 – San Francisco, California, USA  
 Indiana Short Film Festival – October 12, 2013 – Danville, Indiana, USA 
 Yerevan, Armenia – Yerevan Animation Festival – October 2013
 Sydney, Australia – Short Soup International Film Festival – January 19, 2014
 Qazvin, Iran – Qazvin Art Center – March 8, 2014

Awards
 The Royal Reel Award – Canada International Film Festival (2013)
 1st Place – 9th Annual MY HERO International Film Festival in Music Video Category (2013) 
2nd Place – The 6th Annual Boomtown Film and Music Festival in Experimental/Music Video Category (2013)

References

External links
 Linde Nijland's official website
 Traveller official website
 Traveller official music video

2012 short films